Kamila Anna Augustyn (born 14 January 1982 in Słupsk) is a Polish badminton player from Piasta Słupsk club. She won her first elite badminton title at the 2006 Denmark Open in the women's doubles event partnered with Nadieżda Kostiuczyk. She competed at the 2008 Beijing and 2012 London Summer Olympics in the women's singles event.

Achievements

European Junior Championships 
Girls' singles

Girls' doubles

IBF Grand Prix 
The World Badminton Grand Prix sanctioned by International Badminton Federation (IBF) since 1983.

Women's doubles

BWF International Challenge/Series 
Women's singles

Women's doubles

Mixed doubles

 BWF International Challenge tournament
 BWF International Series tournament
 BWF Future Series tournament

References

External links
 
 
 
 

Living people
1982 births
Sportspeople from Słupsk
Polish female badminton players
Olympic badminton players of Poland
Badminton players at the 2008 Summer Olympics
Badminton players at the 2012 Summer Olympics